The 1944 Big Ten Conference football season was the 49th season of college football played by the member schools of the Big Ten Conference (also known as the Western Conference) and was a part of the 1944 college football season.

The 1944 Ohio State Buckeyes football team, under head coach Carroll Widdoes, compiled a perfect 9–0 record, won the Big Ten championship, led the conference in scoring offense (31.9 points per game), and was ranked No. 2 in the final AP Poll. The team was retroactively selected as a national champion by the National Championship Foundation. End Jack Dugger and center John Tavener were also consensus first-team All-Americans.

Michigan, under head coach Fritz Crisler, compiled an 8–2 record, finished in second place in the conference, and was ranked No. 8 in the final AP Poll. Fullback Don Lund received the team's most valuable player award.

Indiana, under head coach Bo McMillin, compiled a 7–3 record and led the conference in scoring defense (7.9 points per game). Center John Tavener was a consensus first-team All-American and received Indiana's most valuable player award.

Season overview

Results and team statistics

Key
AP final = Team's rank in the final AP Poll of the 1945 season
AP high = Team's highest rank in the AP Poll throughout the 1945 season
PPG = Average of points scored per game
PAG = Average of points allowed per game
MVP = Most valuable player as voted by players on each team as part of the voting process to determine the winner of the Chicago Tribune Silver Football trophy

Regular season

Bowl games
During the 1944 season, the Big Ten maintained its long-standing ban on postseason games. Accordingly, no Big Ten teams participated in any bowl games.

All-Big Ten players

The following players were picked by the Associated Press (AP) and/or the United Press (UP) as first-team players on the 1944 All-Big Nine Conference football team.

 Jack Dugger, end, Ohio State (AP, UP)
 Frank Bauman, end, Purdue (AP, UP)
 Milan Lazetich, tackle, Michigan (AP, UP)
 Bill Willis, tackle, Ohio State (AP, UP)
 Bill Hackett, guard, Ohio State (AP, UP)
 Ralph Serpico, guard, Illinois (AP, UP)
 John Tavener, center, Indiana (AP, UP)
 Les Horvath, halfback/quarterback, Ohio State (AP, UP)
 Joe Ponsetto, quarterback, Michigan (AP)
 Buddy Young, halfback, Illinois (AP, UP)
 Babe Dimancheff, fullback/halfback, Purdue (AP, UP)
 Bob Wiese, fullback, Michigan (UP)

All-Americans

At the end of the 1944 season, Big Ten players secured four of the consensus first-team picks for the 1944 College Football All-America Team. The Big Ten's consensus All-Americans were:

 Jack Dugger, end, Ohio State (FWAA, INS, SN, UP, WC)
 Bill Hackett, guard, Ohio State (AAB, AP, COL, FN, FWAA, CP, WC)
 John Tavener, center, Indiana (UP, FWAA, INS, LK, CP)
 Les Horvath, quarterback, Ohio State (AAB, AP, COL, FN, FWAA, INS, LK, NEA, SN, UP, CP, WC)

Other Big Ten players who were named first-team All-Americans by at least one selector were:

 Bill Willis, tackle, Ohio State (LK, SN, UP)
 Ralph Serpico, guard, Illinois (SN)
 Buddy Young, quarterback, Illinois (LK)
 Jug Girard, halfback, Wisconsin (LK)
 Babe Dimancheff, fullback, Purdue (INS, CP)

1945 NFL Draft
The following Big Ten players were selected in the first 10 rounds of the 1945 NFL Draft:

References